Pauline Scanlon (born in Dingle, County Kerry, Ireland) is a singer of contemporary and traditional Irish music.

Dingle is in the Corca Dhuibhne Gaeltacht, which is an area where the population's first language is Irish. Scanlon has been singing professionally since she was 15 years old.

Scanlon has toured extensively worldwide with Sharon Shannon and has been featured on RTÉ's The Late Late Show. She featured on Sharon Shannon's Libertango album (2003), singing "A Case of You", originally by Joni Mitchell.

Her first solo album, Red Colour Sun, was released on the Daisy Label in 2004. (Compass Records in the US) It blended traditional sounds with modern influences. In January 2006, she completed a new project with Donough Hennessy (formerly the guitar player for the Irish band Lunasa) along with Darrell Scott, Kenny Malone, Stuart Duncan and other musicians. The album Hush was released on 15 August 2006 on Compass Records.

Scanlon sang backing vocals for Belinda Carlisle on her 2007 release Voila and for Gaelic Americana artist Kyle Carey on her albums Monongah and North Star.

In early 2009, she joined with Éilís Kennedy to form a band initially under the name of the Dingle White Females, later changed to Lumiere. Lumiere released their debut album (self-titled) on 11 September 2009 on the Sony Ireland label. It was followed by a second album in March 2013, called My Dearest Dear. Scanlon released the album Gossamer in May 2016.

In 2022 she released the album The Unquiet to represent the life of her late mother.

References

External links
 Pauline Scanlon Official Website 
 Lumiere 

Irish folk singers
Irish women singers
Musicians from County Kerry
Living people
People from Dingle
Year of birth missing (living people)